Aohan may refer to:

Aohan Banner, Inner Mongolia, China
Aohans, Southern Mongol subgroup in Aohan Banner